EN1-ST01 is a first class national road on the island of Santiago, Cape Verde. It runs from the capital Praia in the south to Tarrafal in the north, through the mountainous interior of the island. It is 61 km long.

The main intersections are:
north of Praia: Circular da Praia (EN1-ST06)
north of Ribeirão Chiqueiro: to Pedra Badejo (EN1-ST02)
east of João Teves: to Pedra Badejo (EN1-ST03)
north of Assomada: to Calheta de São Miguel (EN1-ST04)
in Tarrafal: to Calheta de São Miguel (EN1-ST02)

See also
Roads in Cape Verde

References

Transport in Santiago, Cape Verde
Assomada
Praia
São Domingos Municipality, Cape Verde
São Lourenço dos Órgãos
São Salvador do Mundo, Cape Verde
Santa Catarina, Cape Verde
Tarrafal Municipality
Road transport in Cape Verde